Marcus Coates is a contemporary artist and ornithologist living in London. His works, including performances and installations that have been recorded as video art, employ shamanistic rituals in communication with "the lower world", and contrast natural and man-made processes.

Career
Coates was born in 1968 in London, UK. He graduated from the Kent Institute of Art and Design in 1990 and completed his MA at the Royal Academy Schools, London, in 1993.

Some of his work has focused on housing in Elephant and Castle, South London, including a film (Vision Quest – a Ritual for Elephant & Castle) and an on-stage trance in 2009. In 2013 Coates was a shortlisted for the Fourth plinth, Trafalgar Square artwork (2015/16). His proposal for the fourth plinth commission is to cast and install a replica of the "Eagle Rock" at Brimham Rocks in Yorkshire, UK.

Coates has exhibited extensively internationally since 1999 including Altermodern, the Tate Triennial and Kunsthalle Zurich in 2009 and "Super 8" at the Museu de Arte Moderna Rio de Janeiro and "Galápagos" at the Centro de Arte Moderna in Lisbon, Portugal in 2013.

Publications 
In 2001, Grizedale Arts published the eponymous book Marcus Coates, based on his residency at Grizedale Arts in 1999. This was followed by The Trip which was published by Koenig Books, and documents his installation at the Serpentine Gallery, London in 2011.

Notable exhibitions 

 2013 "Anchorhold – Meetings with Marcus Coates", Hai arts, Island of Hailuoto, Finland
 2013 "Follow the Voice, City in the City", Canary Wharf Screen, Art on the Underground, London.
 2012 "Proxy", Kate MacGarry, London, UK 
 2012 "Marcus Coates", Workplace Gallery, Gateshead, UK
 2012 "Dawn Chorus", Aberystwyth Arts Centre, Wales, UK 
 2012 "Follow The Voice", Canary Wharf, Screen, London, UK
 2012 "Vision Quest: a ritual for Elephant & Castle", Elephant & Castle Shopping Centre, London 
 2012 "Stories from the Lower World", South Alberta Art Gallery, Canada
 2012 "Eva International  Biennial of Visual Art", Limerick City, Ireland
 2011 "Skills Exchange: Urban Transformation and the Politics of Care, a project for the Process Room at the Serpentine Gallery", London
 2011 "The Trip", Serpentine Gallery, London
 2010 "Implicit Sound", ESPAI 13, Fundació Joan Miró, Barcelona
 2010 "Questions & Answers", Kate MacGarry, London
 2010 Port Eliot Festival, Cornwall (performance)
 2010 "Psychopomp", Milton Keynes Gallery
 2009 Altermodern, Tate Britain, London
 2009 "Marcus Coates", Mori Art Museum, Tokyo (performance)
 2009 "Marcus Coates", Kunsthalle Zurich – Parallel Space (exhibition and performance)
 2009 "The Plover's Wing", Workplace Gallery, Gateshead
 2008 "Marcus Coates", NOMA New Orleans Museum of Art
 2008 "Marcus Coates", Kunsthalle Zurich – Parallel Space (exhibition and performance

References 

1968 births
Living people
Artists from London
English contemporary artists
British conceptual artists